Good Boy(s) may refer to:

 Good Boy (EP), an EP by Baek Ji-young
 Good Boy, a 1928 musical by Herbert Stothart, Otto Harbach, Bert Kalmar and Harry Ruby
 "Good Boy" (song), a song by G-Dragon and Taeyang
 Good Boy (comics), a Marvel Comics character
 Good Boy!, a 2003 film
 Gud Boy, a 2012 Indian Oriya film
 The Good Boy, a 2016 Russian film directed by Oksana Karas
 "Good Boys (song)", a 2003 song by Blondie
 Good Boys (film), a 2019 American film
 The Good Boys,  a 1997 Indian Malayalam film
 Goodboys, a British production trio
 "Good Boy" (Into the Dark), an episode of the second season of Into the Dark